Kenneth Bonert is a South African-Canadian writer. His debut novel The Lion Seeker won both the 2013 National Jewish Book Award for Outstanding Debut Fiction and the 2013 Edward Lewis Wallant Award. The Lion Seeker was also a shortlisted nominee for the 2013 Governor General's Award for English-language Fiction, and the 2013 Amazon.ca First Novel Award. Bonert's second novel, The Mandela Plot, was released in 2018.

Originally from Johannesburg, Bonert moved to Toronto, Ontario in 1989.

Bonert has previously published short stories, including the Journey Prize nominee "Packers and Movers", as well as a novella, Peacekeepers, 1995, which appeared in McSweeney's.

References

External links
Kenneth Bonert at Random House Canada

Canadian male novelists
South African male novelists
Canadian male short story writers
South African male short story writers
South African short story writers
21st-century Canadian novelists
South African emigrants to Canada
Jewish Canadian writers
Writers from Toronto
People from Johannesburg
South African Jews
Living people
21st-century Canadian short story writers
21st-century Canadian male writers
Year of birth missing (living people)